Maria Teresa Jordà i Roura (born 19 June 1972) is a Spanish politician from Catalonia and the current Minister of Climate Action, Food and Rural Agenda of Catalonia. 

She was previously the Minister of Agriculture, Livestock, Fisheries and Food of Catalonia, member of the Congress of Deputies and mayor of Ripoll, a municipality in north-east Spain.

Early life
Jordà was born on 19 June 1972 in Ripoll, Catalonia. She has a degree in modern and contemporary history from the Autonomous University of Barcelona.

Career
Jordà contested the 1999 local elections as a Republican Left of Catalonia-Acord Municipal (ERC-AM) electoral alliance candidate in Ripoll and was elected. She was re-elected at the 2003 local elections. At the 2003 election ERC-AM formed a pact with the Socialists' Party of Catalonia-Municipal Progress and Junts per Ripoll-Initiative for Catalonia Greens-Agreement for Municipal Progress alliances to
gain control of the municipality from Convergence and Union (Ciu) and Jordà became mayor of Ripoll. She was re-elected at the 2007 and 2011 local elections. ERC-AM lost control of the municipality to CiU in 2011 and Jordà ceased being mayor. She was re-elected at the 2015 local elections.

Jordà was vice-president of the Fundació Eduard Soler de Ripoll, president of the Fundació Guifré and a member of the executive of the Federació de Municipis de Catalunya.

Jordà contested the 2011 general election as a Republican Left of Catalonia–Catalonia Yes (ERC–CatSí) candidate in the Province of Girona and was elected to the Congress of Deputies. She was re-elected at the 2015 and 2016 general elections. She resigned from the municipality council in July 2017 to concentrate on her Congress of Deputies work.

On 19 May 2018 newly elected President of Catalonia Quim Torra nominated a new government in which Jordà was to be Minister of Agriculture, Livestock, Fisheries and Food. She was sworn in on 2 June 2018 at the Palau de la Generalitat de Catalunya.

Political positions 
In 2013 she defended the effectiveness of homeopathy and other alternative treatments in the Congress of Deputies. In July 2018, as Minister of Agriculture, Livestock, Fisheries and Food of the Catalan government, she promoted the consumption of raw milk in the region.

Electoral history

References

External links
 
 

1972 births
Agriculture ministers of Catalonia
Autonomous University of Barcelona alumni
Women politicians from Catalonia
Fisheries ministers of Catalonia
Living people
Mayors of places in Catalonia
Members of the 10th Congress of Deputies (Spain)
Members of the 11th Congress of Deputies (Spain)
Members of the 12th Congress of Deputies (Spain)
People from Ripollès
Republican Left of Catalonia politicians
Torra Government
Women members of the Congress of Deputies (Spain)